The Vick Foundation was established  in February 2004 to award an annual prize for best Bulgarian novel. There is also a competition for the most popular short-listed book, based on votes cast by the general public. In 2008, the award will celebrate its 5th anniversary, and the foundation is on the path to becoming an institution in Bulgaria.

History
Vick's initiative was acclaimed by those who saw in the prize a new opportunity for the Bulgarian literature after almost 15 years of standstill.

A permanent committee, which includes Stefan Danailov, the current Minister of Culture of Bulgaria, elects а jury. Other members in the committee are Raymond Wagenstein, Boyan Biolchev, Nedyalko Yordanov, Hristo Droumev and Ivan Granitski. The jury changes each year and they select a short list of six Bulgarian novels from which the winner is chosen. One of the member making up the 2008 jury is Meglena Kuneva, the current European commissioner in Bulgaria.

The aim of the foundation is also to enable others to gain access into Bulgarian literature, especially for the literary world beyond Bulgaria.

The award ceremony each year is well attended by members of Bulgarian society and journalist, as can be seen by the photo gallery on the website. The event is covered by TV channels in Bulgaria and causes quite a media furor annually. KariZa and other well-known performers have graced the stages during the award ceremony and the ceremonies are known to be of much entertainment value.

The competition is organised with the support of EVS Translations

Vick Prize winners
2004: Ekzekoutorat (The Executioner (Kisyov novel)) by Stefan Kisyov
2005: Staklenata reka (The Glass River) by Emil Andreev
2006: Amazonkata na Varoe (Varoe's Amazon) by Prof. Boyan Biolchev
2007: Partien Dom  (Party Headquarters) by Georgi Tenev
2008: Photo Stoyanovich by Evgenia Ivanova

References

External links
Official site
EVS Translations
About Edward Vick
Sofia Echo reports on short-listed novels

Bulgarian literary awards
Arts foundations based in Europe
Organizations based in Bulgaria
Organizations established in 2004
Awards established in 2004